Pedro Richard Irala (born 14 April 1979) is a Paraguayan footballer who plays for Defensa y Justicia. He previously played for Olympiakos Volou and Rodos F.C. in the Greek Beta Ethniki.

Club career
Irala previously played for several Paraguayan teams like Sport Colombia, Guaraní and Cerro Porteño, and for Uruguayan side Danubio F.C. In 2008, he was transferred to Greece to play for Olympiakos Volou. In 2010, Ilioupoli F.C. showed interest in buying the player.

References

External links
 Profile on TenfieldDigital.com 
 

1979 births
Living people
Paraguayan footballers
Paraguay international footballers
Association football midfielders
Danubio F.C. players
Club Guaraní players
Cerro Porteño players
Sport Colombia footballers
Sportivo Luqueño players
Defensa y Justicia footballers
Olympiacos Volos F.C. players
Rodos F.C. players
Expatriate footballers in Argentina
Expatriate footballers in Uruguay
Expatriate footballers in Greece